In enzymology, a nitroalkane oxidase is an enzyme that catalyzes the chemical reaction

a nitroalkane + H2O + O2  an aldehyde or ketone + nitrite + H2O2

The 3 substrates of this enzyme are nitroalkane, H2O, and O2, whereas its 4 products are aldehyde, ketone, nitrite, and H2O2.

This enzyme belongs to the family of oxidoreductases, specifically those acting on other nitrogenous compounds as donors with oxygen as acceptor.  The systematic name of this enzyme class is nitroalkane:oxygen oxidoreductase. Other names in common use include nitroethane oxidase, NAO, and nitroethane:oxygen oxidoreductase.  This enzyme participates in nitrogen metabolism.

References

 
 
 
 
 

EC 1.7.3
Enzymes of unknown structure